Exeter is a town in Washington County, Rhode Island,  United States.  Exeter extends east from the Connecticut border to the town of North Kingstown. It is bordered to the north by West Greenwich and East Greenwich, and to the south by Hopkinton, Richmond, and South Kingstown. Exeter's postal code is 02822, although small parts of the town have the mailing address West Kingston (02892) or Saunderstown (02874).  The population was 6,460 at the 2020 census.

History 
Native Americans lived in the town prior to King Philip's War, and Wawaloam, a female Narragansett/Nipmuc leader lived in the town in the 1660s. The town of Exeter was formed in 1742 from the western part of North Kingstown. The name Exeter derives from the county town and cathedral city of Exeter in Devon, England.  Numerous other places have also been given the name.  Exeter is noted by folklorists as the site of one of the best documented examples of vampire exhumation: the Mercy Brown Vampire Incident of 1892.

Geography

Demographics

As of the census of 2000, there were 6,045 people, 2,085 households, and 1,592 families residing in the town. The racial makeup of the town was 96.36% White, 0.66% African American, 0.60% Native American, 0.74% Asian, 0.02% Pacific Islander, 0.33% from other races, and 1.29% from two or more races. Hispanic or Latino of any race were 1.27% of the population.

There were 2,085 households, out of which 38.0% had children under the age of 18 living with them, 64.4% were married couples living together, 8.7% had a female householder with no husband present, and 23.6% were non-families. 16.8% of all households were made up of individuals, and 4.6% had someone living alone who was 65 years of age or older.  The average household size was 2.77 and the average family size was 3.15.

In the town, the population was spread out, with 26.3% under the age of 18, 6.4% from 18 to 24, 31.6% from 25 to 44, 26.0% from 45 to 64, and 9.7% who were 65 years of age or older.  The median age was 38 years. For every 100 females, there were 96.7 males.  For every 100 females age 18 and over, there were 96.0 males.

The median income for a household in the town was $64,452, and the median income for a family was $74,157. Males had a median income of $47,083 versus $36,928 for females. The per capita income for the town was $25,530.  About 4.5% of families and 5.5% of the population were below the poverty line, including 7.5% of those under age 18 and 10.2% of those age 65 or over.

Government
The town government is directed by a 5-member town council that is headed by a council president. For the purpose of school administration, Exeter is a member town of the Exeter-West Greenwich Regional School District along with the neighboring town of West Greenwich.

Attractions and National Historic Places in Exeter
Yawgoo Valley is the only ski resort in Rhode Island.
 Austin Farm Road Agricultural Area
 Baptist Church in Exeter
 Exeter Chapel
 Fisherville Historic and Archeological District
 Hallville Historic and Archeological District
 Lawton's Mill
 Simon Lillibridge Farm
 Parris Brook Historic and Archeological District
 Queen's Fort
 Sodom Mill Historic and Archeological District
Tomaquag Museum, only solely Native American museum in Rhode Island

Notable people

 George Wait Babcock, privateer
 Job Kenyon, politician

References

External links

 EDC Profile of Exeter
 RI.GOV – Town of Exeter
 Town of Exeter, Rhode Island website
 Exeter Town Library
 Exeter-West Greenwich Regional School District
 Exeter Town Hall
 Welcome to South County Rhode Island
 R.I. Veterans Memorial Cemetery
United States Constitution Referendum Ratification: Exeter from the Rhode Island State Archives

 
Towns in Rhode Island
Towns in Washington County, Rhode Island
Providence metropolitan area